Dr. Acula is a variation of the name Dracula.

Dr. Acula may also refer to:
 Pseudonym of Forrest J Ackerman (1916–2008), American collector
 Dr. Acula (band), deathcore band from Long Island, New York
 Dr. Acula, fictional film by the Scrubs character J.D.
 Dr. Acula, film proposed by Ed Wood, as depicted in Ed Wood (film)
 Dr. Acula, post-hardcore band Bear vs. Shark
 Dr. Acula, in the Ed Wood film Night of the Ghouls
 Dr. Acula, in an episode "Fangboy" of Fanboy & Chum Chum series

See also 
 Dracula (disambiguation)
 Acula (disambiguation)